Pathogens and Global Health is a peer-reviewed medical journal published by Taylor & Francis. It covers tropical diseases, including their microbiology, epidemiology and molecular biology, as well as medical entomology, HIV/AIDS, malaria, and tuberculosis. The editor-in-chief is Andrea Crisanti (Imperial College London).

History
The journal was established by Sir Ronald Ross in 1906 as Annals of Tropical Medicine and Parasitology to share the results of the Liverpool School of Tropical Medicine's research and field expeditions. In May 2011, the journal was purchased by Maney Publishing, obtaining its current title in 2012, reflecting a broader focus including the biology, immunology, genetics, treatment, and control of pathogens of medical relevance beyond a regional definition.

Abstracting and indexing
The journal is abstracted and indexed in:

According to the Journal Citation Reports, the journal has a 2021 impact factor of 3.735.

References

External links
 

Taylor & Francis academic journals
Publications established in 1906
English-language journals
Parasitology journals
Microbiology journals
International medical and health organizations
Epidemiology journals